Arrowhead Trail may refer to :
Arrowhead Trail (auto trail), connecting Los Angeles, California to Salt Lake City, Utah
Arrowhead Trail, Pennsylvania, a rail trail in Washington County, Pennsylvania, see List of rail trails in Pennsylvania